Macenta Airport  is an airport serving Macenta, a town in the Nzérékoré Region of Guinea.

See also
Transport in Guinea
List of airports in Guinea

References

External links
OpenStreetMap - Macenta
OurAirports - Macenta
Macenta

Airports in Guinea